Richard A. Heyman (c. 1935 – September 16, 1994) was an American mayor who was mayor of Key West, Florida from 1983 to 1985 and from 1987 to 1989. He was one of the first openly gay public officials in the United States.

Early life
Richard A. Heyman was born circa 1935. He grew up in Grand Rapids, Ohio. He graduated from Ohio State University in 1957.

Career
Heyman began his career as a schoolteacher in Grand Rapids, Ohio. He later works in recruitment in Toledo, Ohio. In the 1960s, he moved to Key West, Florida, where he co-founded the Gingerbread Square Gallery in 1972.

Heyman served as the mayor of Key West, Florida from 1983 to 1985 and from 1987 to 1989. He was one of the first openly gay public officials in the United States. Under his leadership, the City of Key West passed a resolution to make it illegal for employers to fire staff who had HIV/AIDS.

Personal life, death and legacy
Heyman had a long-time partner, John Kiraly. He died of AIDS-related pneumonia on September 16, 1994. He was 59 years old.

His papers are held at the Cornell University Library in Ithaca, New York.

The Richard A. Heyman Environmental Pollution Control Facility in Key West was named in his honor. In 2010, a documentary about Richard Heyman's first term as mayor,  directed by John Mikytuck, The Newcomer, was released.

In 2018, Teri Johnston was elected as Key West's first openly lesbian mayor.

References

1935 births
1994 deaths
People from Wood County, Ohio
Ohio State University alumni
Mayors of Key West, Florida
Gay politicians
LGBT mayors of places in the United States
LGBT people from Florida
LGBT people from Ohio
AIDS-related deaths in Florida
20th-century American politicians
20th-century American LGBT people